Bulgaria competed at the 2006 Winter Olympics in Turin, Italy.

Medalists

Alpine skiing 

Note: In the men's combined, run 1 is the downhill, and runs 2 and 3 are the slalom. In the women's combined, run 1 and 2 are the slalom, and run 3 the downhill.

Biathlon 

Men

Women

Key: LAP indicates an athlete was lapped, and did not finish the race.

Cross-country skiing 

Distance

Sprint

Figure skating 

Key: CD = Compulsory Dance, FD = Free Dance, FS = Free Skate, OD = Original Dance, SP = Short program

Luge

Short track speed skating 

Key: 'ADV' indicates a skater was advanced due to being interfered with.

Ski jumping 

Note: PQ indicates a skier was pre-qualified for the final, based on entry rankings.

Snowboarding 

Parallel GS

Key: '+ Time' represents a deficit; the brackets indicate the results of each run.

Snowboard Cross

References
 

Nations at the 2006 Winter Olympics
2006
Winter Olympics